Ezra Attiya (31 January 1885 – 25 May 1970) was one of the greatest teachers of Torah in the Sephardic Jewish world during the 20th century. He was rosh yeshiva of Porat Yosef Yeshiva in Jerusalem for 45 years, nurturing thousands of students who, together with their students, constitute the bulk of Sephardic Torah leadership today.

Early life
Attiya was born on 31 January 1885 (Tu Bishvat 5645 on the Jewish calendar) in Aleppo, Syria, which was then part of the Ottoman Empire. His parents, Yitzchak and Leah, had lost several children in infancy, and before his birth they traveled to the gravesite of the Prophet Ezra to pray that if the child they were expecting was a boy, they would name him Ezra and see that he dedicated himself to a life of Torah. He had one brother, Eliyahu. His father, a respected Aleppo melamed (teacher), was a direct descendant of Shem Tov Attiya, a disciple of Joseph Caro, author of the Shulchan Aruch.

When Attiya was 16 years old, his family immigrated to Jerusalem's Old City, to which a large number of rabbis from Aleppo had immigrated. Soon after, his father died, leaving an impoverished widow and two orphans. While his mother hired herself out for domestic work in the homes of wealthy people, young Ezra decided to devote his life to Torah study. He went to learn, pray, and sleep on a bench in a small beth midrash in the Bukharim neighborhood of the New City called Shoshanim LeDavid, covering vast amounts of the Talmud with commentaries and poskim (halakhic decisors). As money was scarce in his household, he sustained himself with a nightly meal of dry pita seasoned with salt. In his old age, he told his students, "When I was young, I studied Torah through hardship. If we were truly fortunate, my mother and I had a whole pita to share. On rare occasions we also had an egg, which we divided in half. But the hunger did not bother me in the least."

In 1907, Ezra Harari-Raful, another Aleppo immigrant, established Yeshivat Ohel Moed in Jerusalem. Attiya was asked to join its staff along with distinguished Sephardic Rabbis Yosef Yedid HaLevi, head of the Sephardic beit din (rabbinical court) of Jerusalem, Shlomo Laniado, and Avraham Haim Ades. He served as maggid shiur.

In 1909, Attiya married Bolissa Salem, daughter of Avraham Salem, a kabbalist. In 1911 their first son was born, but died in infancy.

At the beginning of World War I, there was a general mobilization for the Turkish army and all able-bodied men were snatched off the streets. Attiya's brother Eliyahu died of pneumonia in the Turkish army. Two of the leading Sephardic sages of Jerusalem, Chaim Shaul Dweck Hakohen and Avraham Ades, smuggled Attiya to Egypt using a forged Russian passport, which at that time did not require a photograph.

Attiya settled in Cairo. At first he attempted to go into business, but quickly lost most of his money. Then he met Nissim Nachum, a wealthy refugee who knew him from Jerusalem. With Nachum's backing, Attiya opened a yeshiva named Ahavah VeAchvah in the basement of the Cairo rabbinate. Under his direction, the yeshiva grew to 100 students, attracting many from secular backgrounds. Attiya also gave classes to working men, and was a dayan on the Cairo beit din. After World War I ended his wife joined him. They and their two children returned to Jerusalem in 1922.

Rabbinic career

In Jerusalem, Attiya returned to his teaching position at Ohel Mo'ed Yeshiva. He also studied privately with Chaim Shaul Dweck and Solomon Eliezer Alfandari. When Porat Yosef Yeshiva opened in 1923, Ohel Moed was merged with the new yeshiva and Attiya was appointed as the mashgiach ruchani. Following the sudden death of the rosh yeshiva, Shlomo Laniado, in 1925, Attiya was named his successor. He served as rosh yeshiva for 45 years.

Attiya's tenure as rosh yeshiva was marked by political upheaval. When the 1929 Arab riots cut off access to the yeshiva building in the Old City, Attiya moved classes to several synagogues in the New City and appointed advanced students to teach them, while he personally supervised every location. This situation continued for eight years. During the 1948 Arab-Israeli War, the yeshiva again evacuated to synagogues in the Katamon, Geula and Bucharim neighborhoods. This time, however, the main yeshiva building in the Old City was burned to the ground by Jordanian troops, and thousands of Attiya's unpublished writings were burned along with it. He refused to rewrite them, feeling that they were not meant for publication. Instead, his students would be his lifetime achievement.

In the mid-1950s, Porat Yosef Yeshiva and the Gerrer community jointly purchased a plot of land in the Geula neighborhood, where the yeshiva and the Ger beis medrash were built side by side. The original yeshiva campus in the Old City was rebuilt and reopened in the 1970s.

Influence

One of Attiya's greatest accomplishments was changing the way that yeshiva education was viewed in the Sephardic world. Until that time, full-time Torah learning past the age of bar mitzvah was reserved for gifted students from Sephardic homes; most Sephardic boys went to work to help support their families. Attiya did everything he could to enable boys to continue learning into their teens, many times offering to underwrite the costs of their education. In one case, a poor boy from Iraq applied for admission to the yeshiva but could not provide the necessary tuition. Attiya went to Ben Zion Chazan, the yeshiva's founder and secretary, and offered to reduce his own salary to accommodate the boy. Chazan then offered to reduce his own salary as well. The boy went on to become a respected talmid chacham.

Attiya was similarly instrumental in keeping the young Ovadia Yosef in the Torah world. At one point, the promising young scholar suddenly stopped coming to yeshiva for several days. Attiya paid a visit to his home and was shocked by the poverty he saw there. Yosef's father explained that he owned a small grocery store and needed his son to work for him. Attiya's efforts to convince the father of the importance of Torah learning fell on deaf ears. The next morning, when the father entered his store, he found Attiya standing there wearing a work apron. The rosh yeshiva explained that he had come to the store early that morning when Yosef was opening up. He had told the boy that he had found a substitute worker who would work without pay, and sent him back to yeshiva. "You said that you needed someone to help and could not afford to pay. I am that someone. Your son's learning is more important than my time!" The father finally conceded and allowed his son to continue learning.

Attiya was personally involved with every student in his yeshiva. He tested the younger boys every two to three months, gave a daily shiur to the older boys, taught a nightly shiur to the married kollel students, and gave a weekly musar (ethics) lecture — often lasting up to two hours — to the entire yeshiva.

He also developed a unique Sephardic approach to Torah and musar. He always carried a copy of the musar classic Chovot ha-Levavot ("Duties of the Heart") on his person, and strongly advised his students to do the same. He instructed every class in the yeshiva to begin each day with a short musar lesson.

He was greatly respected by such Torah leaders as Tzvi Pesach Frank and the Chazon Ish. After visiting with him, the Chazon Ish expressed the opinion, "The rosh yeshivah possesses the power of reasoning like one of the Rishonim". He had an encyclopedic knowledge of all areas of Torah. One of his leading students, Ovadia Yosef, testified at Attiya's funeral that his teacher knew the entire Choshen Mishpat (the section of the Shulchan Aruch dealing with monetary laws) by heart.

Attiya also served as a dayan (rabbinical judge) on the Sephardic beit din of Jerusalem. His opinion was sought and valued by rabbinical leaders and laymen alike.

Final years
Advancing age and weakness forced Attiya to give up much of his responsibilities at the yeshiva. However, he continued to make himself available for advice and consultation with anyone who needed him. In this way, he continued to nurture the Sephardic Torah leaders he had trained and dispatched to communities around the world.

In 1969, he became seriously ill and drifted in and out of a coma for an entire year. He died in Jerusalem on the morning of 25 May 1970 (19 Iyar 5730) and was buried on Har HaMenuchot.

He was succeeded as rosh yeshiva by Yehuda Tzadka, who had learned under him since the age of 14.

Notable students
Attiya fulfilled his goal of training Sephardic Torah scholars who could build Sephardic communities at large. During his tenure, he trained thousands of students, including many of the future leaders of Sephardic Jewry in Israel, the United States, Europe, South Africa and South America. These students included: Ovadia Yosef and Mordechai Eliyahu, future Sephardic Chief Rabbis of Israel; Yitzchak Kaduri, renowned kabbalist; Yehuda Tzadka, who succeeded him as rosh yeshiva of Porat Yosef; Ben Zion Abba Shaul; Baruch Ben Haim, who became a leader of the Syrian Jewish community in Brooklyn, New York; Eliyahu Ben Haim, rabbi of the Mashadi community in Great Neck, New York; and Zion Levy, Chief Rabbi of Panama.

References

1885 births
1970 deaths
20th-century rabbis in Jerusalem
Burials at Har HaMenuchot
Israeli people of Syrian-Jewish descent
Israeli Rosh yeshivas
Jews in the French Mandate for Syria and the Lebanon
People from Aleppo
Sephardi rabbis in Mandatory Palestine
Sephardic Haredi rabbis in Israel
Sephardi Jews in Ottoman Palestine
Sephardi Jews in Ottoman Syria
Syrian emigrants to Israel
Syrian Jews